Vlasenica is a town and municipality located in Republika Srpska, an entity of Bosnia and Herzegovina. As of 2013, it has a population 11,467 inhabitants, while the town of Vlasenica has a population of 7,228 inhabitants.
.

History
Some 70-200 Serbs were brutally massacred by Muslim Ustaše forces in Vlasenica's Rašića Gaj municipality between 22 June and 20 July 1941, after raping women and girls. At the end of July and beginning of August 1941 another group of 50 Serbs from Vlasenica District (mostly from Milići) were imprisoned and murdered. Between 2,000 and 3,000 Muslims were massacred by Serb Chetniks in Vlasenica, from December 1941 until February 1942...

Demographics

Settlements

Population

Ethnic composition

Economy

The following table gives a preview of total number of registered people employed in legal entities per their core activity (as of 2018):

Notable people
 Lazar Jovanović, 19th-century manuscript writer
 Derviš Sušić, writer
 Flory Jagoda, musician 
 Vedad Ibišević, footballer
 Fahrudin Kuduzović, footballer

See also
 Municipalities of Republika Srpska
 Massacres of Serbs in Rašića Gaj

Notes

External links

 

 
Populated places in Vlasenica
Cities and towns in Republika Srpska
Glasinac plateau